The 1899 Tulane Olive and Blue football team was an American football team that represented Tulane University as a member of the Southern Intercollegiate Athletic Association (SIAA) during the 1899 college football season. In their first year under head coach Harris T. Collier, the team compiled an overall record of 0–6–1.

Schedule

References

Tulane
Tulane Green Wave football seasons
College football winless seasons
Tulane Olive and Blue football